The Adventures of Frontier Fremont, released in the UK as Spirit of the Wild, is a 1976 American Western adventure film directed by Richard Friedenberg, starring Dan Haggerty and Denver Pyle.
The Adventures of Frontier Fremont, a family based movie, tells the story of Jacob "Frontier" Fremont.  Fremont, originally from St. Louis, gives up his job as a tinsmith in favor of a life as a mountain man. In the mountains he befriends and protects many local animals. Denver Pyle co-stars as "the old mountaineer".  Three of the stars, Dan Haggerty, Denver Pyle and Don Shanks, also appeared together in the TV series "The Life And Times Of Grizzly Adams".

Cast
 Dan Haggerty as Jacob "Frontier" Fremont
 Denver Pyle as Old mountain man
 Tony Mirrati as Kemp
 Norman Goodman as Williams
 Teri Hernandez as Shining Water
 Don Shanks as Indian
 Lee Sollenberger as Man at fort

Production
Parts of the film were shot in Park City, Kamas and Uinta National Forest in Utah.

References

External links
 

1976 films
1976 Western (genre) films
American Western (genre) films
Works about mountain men
Films shot in Utah
Films directed by Richard Friedenberg
1970s English-language films
1970s American films